Application-Level Profile Semantics (ALPS) is a data format similar to HTML Microformats that is representation agnostic.
That is, it makes it possible to describe the semantics of an application without requiring
that those semantics be encoded in HTML or some other specific format.

The purpose of ALPS is similar to what the Web Ontology Language (OWL) does, but its focus is more narrowly defined. Where OWL can represent the structure of many different kinds of knowledge, ALPS focuses on how semantics are used within applications, which is especially useful for APIs.

References

Microformats
Web syndication formats